Kim Jong-boo (Hangul: 김종부, born 13 January 1965) is a South Korean football manager and former player. He was one of the most influential footballers in South Korea during the 1980s.

Playing career 
In the 1983 FIFA World Youth Championship, Kim showed great performances including his two goals and two assists, leading South Korean under-20 team to the semi-finals. He became the most popular young footballer in South Korea after the World Youth Championship, and interested K League clubs. Prior to his graduation from Korea University, Kim wanted to join Daewoo Royals which was employing his former coach Lee Cha-man, but Korea University pressured on him to join Hyundai Horang-i due to their deal with Hyundai. During the conflict between Daewoo and Hyundai over him, Hyundai insisted on his agreement after getting a provisional contract with his brother-in-law who was his agent. Afterwards, Kim denied the provisional contract by announcing he would go to Daewoo, and Korea University deprived him of his qualification as a player to obstruct his move to Daewoo. However, they postponed their disciplinary action against him until after the 1986 FIFA World Cup due to other national players' complaints. Kim played two World Cup matches as a substitute with the help of his colleagues. He scored the equaliser in a 1–1 draw with Bulgaria, earning South Korea's first-ever World Cup point.

The conflict between Daewoo and Hyundai was continued even after the World Cup, and Kim couldn't make any official appearance due to his suspension until 1987. By the way, the Korea Football Association (KFA) allowed his registration as a Daewoo player in November 1987, trying to bring him back into the field. Hyundai announced the dissolution of their football club after being outraged at KFA's decision. KFA president Choi Soon-young had to resign to pacify Hyundai, one of the biggest sponsors in South Korean football, and Kim also had to join one of the other clubs. Kim finally joined POSCO Atoms in 1988, but two-year dispute weakened him physically and mentally. His professional career wasn't as successful as expected.

Career statistics

Club

International 
Results list South Korea's goal tally first.

Honours

Player
Korea University
Korean National Championship: 1985

POSCO Atoms
K League 1: 1988

Daewoo Royals
K League 1: 1991

Ilhwa Chunma
K League 1: 1993, 1994

South Korea
Dynasty Cup: 1990

Individual
Korean FA Player of the Year: 1983
Korean FA Best XI: 1983, 1984, 1985
K League 1 top assist provider: 1988

Manager
Hwaseong FC
K3 League: 2014

Gyeongnam FC
K League 2: 2017

Individual
K League 2 Manager of the Year: 2017

References

Notes

External links
 
 Kim Jong-boo at KFA 
 
 
 

1965 births
Living people
People from Tongyeong
Association football forwards
South Korean footballers
South Korea international footballers
Pohang Steelers players
Busan IPark players
Seongnam FC players
K League 1 players
1986 FIFA World Cup players
Sportspeople from South Gyeongsang Province
Korea University alumni
Gyeongnam FC managers
hebei F.C. managers